Dilnaz Muratkyzy Akhmadieva (Dılnaz Mūratqyzy Ahmadieva) is a Kazakhstani pop singer and actress of Uyghur origin, born (November 20, 1980) and raised in Almaty, Kazakhstan.

Songs sung by Dilnaz
Russian
Mozhet Odnazhdy
Mezhdu Nami Zima
Bez Tebya (featuring Miya)
Razluka (Russian version of Lara Fabian's Adagio)
Zolotoi
Romeo & Juliet

Uyghur
Bulbul Nawasi
Ashiq Boldum

Kazakh
Mama
Kewil Saginish

English
Lonely
Last Dance

Discography
2001 Mozhet Odnazhdy
2002 Wapadarim
2005 Zolotoj
2007 My heart
2010 Lyubov zadety
2014 Dumai obo mne
2015 Koz aldimda

Filmography
Nomad (2006)

References

External links
Interview at CentralAsia.ru (in Russian)

1980 births
Living people
21st-century Kazakhstani women singers
Kazakhstani pop singers
English-language singers from Kazakhstan
Russian-language singers of Kazakhstan
Contraltos
People from Almaty
Kazakhstani people of Uyghur descent